Viktoriya Viktorovna Tolstoganova (born 24 March 1972) is a Russian film and theater actress.

Biography
Viktoriya Tolstoganova was born in Moscow, Russian SFSR, Soviet Union.
Born on March 24, 1972 in Moscow in the family of an engineer and an English teacher. She has three younger sisters. After graduating high school, she tried to enter theater university. In 1992, Victoria passed the selection at both Gerasimov Institute of Cinematography (VGIK) and GITIS. Her choice fell on Russian Academy of Theatre Arts (GITIS), where she studied traditional school of Russian psychological theatre for Professor Joseph Heifits. While still a student, she was invited to the troupe of the Moscow Art Theatre, where she served until the mid-2000s.

Tolstoganova graduated from GITIS in 1997 and made her film debut playing a major role in the short feature film “Day Duty” directed by Roman Khrushchev.

Career
In 2003 she played the role of Marina in The Magnetic Storms. In 2004 she was selected to help chose the recipients of Russia's Triumph Prize winners. In 2005 she was a member of the jury at the 27th Moscow International Film Festival. In 2007 she played a prostitute in the film May. In 2010 she starred in the Klim Shipenko directed Who am I? playing a provincial journalist.

Personal life
In August 1996, Tolstoganova married actor Andrei Kuzichev. They have two children: daughter Varvara and son Fedor. The couple divorced in 2010 (according to other sources in 2011).
On 17 May 2011 the actress gave birth to a son, Ivan. The boy’s father is theater director Alexey Agranovich.

Selected filmography

Film

Television

Awards and nominations
 2003: Golden Eagle Award - Best Supporting Actress (Antikiller) – Nominee
 2003: Golden Aries Award - Best Actress (Magnitnye buri) – Nominee
 2004: Golden Eagle Award - Best Actress (Magnitnye buri) – Nominee
 2004: Nika Award - Best Actress (Magnitnye buri) – Nominee
 2013: Golden Eagle Award - Best Supporting Actress (Shpion) - Winner
 2016: Golden Eagle Award - Best Television Actress (Palach) - Winner
 2019: The Golden Unicorn Awards - Best Actress (Vyshe neba) – Nominee

References

External links 

Unofficial Russian fan site

1972 births
Living people
Russian film actresses
Russian stage actresses
Russian television actresses
Actresses from Moscow
20th-century Russian actresses
21st-century Russian actresses
Russian Academy of Theatre Arts alumni